Danijel Milićević (born 5 January 1986) is a Bosnian professional football coach and former player, who played as an attacking midfielder.

Milićević started his professional career at Lugano, before joining Yverdon in 2006. In 2009, he moved to Eupen. Two years later, he switched to Charleroi. In 2014, Milićević was transferred to Gent, who loaned him to Metz in 2018. Later that year, he went back to Eupen. In 2020, he signed with Seraing.

A former Swiss youth international, Milićević made his senior international debut for Bosnia and Herzegovina in 2016, earning 3 caps until 2017.

Club career

Early career
Milićević started playing football at a local club Biaschesi, before joining youth setup of his hometown team Bellinzona. He made his professional debut playing for Lugano in 2004 at the age of 18.

In January 2006, he signed with Yverdon.

In January 2009, Milićević moved to Belgian side Eupen.

In the summer of 2011, he switched to Charleroi.

Gent
In January 2014, Milićević was transferred to Gent for an undisclosed fee. He made his official debut for the team on 18 January against Kortrijk. On 17 August, he scored his a brace in a triumph over Zulte Waregem, which were his first goals for Gent. He won his first trophy with the club on 21 May 2015, when they were crowned league champions for the first time in their history.

On 16 September, Milićević made his UEFA Champions League debut against Lyon and managed to score a goal.

In January 2016, he extended his contract until June 2019.

Milićević played his 100th game for the team on 13 August.

He scored his first career hat-trick on 20 September 2017 against Geel.

In January 2018, he was loaned to French outfit Metz until the end of season.

Later stage of career
In June 2018, Milićević returned to Eupen.

In October 2020, he signed with Seraing.

He announced his retirement from football on 17 June 2021.

International career
Despite representing Switzerland at various youth levels, Milićević decided to play for Bosnia and Herzegovina at senior level.

In June 2016, his request to change sports citizenship from Swiss to Bosnian was approved by FIFA. Subsequently, he received his first senior call-up in August 2016, for a 2018 FIFA World Cup qualifier against Estonia, and debuted in that game on 6 September.

Career statistics

Club

International

Honours
Charleroi
Belgian First Division B: 2011–12

Gent
Belgian First Division A: 2014–15
Belgian Super Cup: 2015

References

External links

1986 births
Living people
People from Bellinzona
Sportspeople from Ticino
Swiss people of Bosnia and Herzegovina descent
Citizens of Bosnia and Herzegovina through descent
Swiss men's footballers
Switzerland youth international footballers
Switzerland under-21 international footballers
Swiss expatriate footballers
Bosnia and Herzegovina footballers
Bosnia and Herzegovina international footballers
Bosnia and Herzegovina expatriate footballers
Association football midfielders
FC Lugano players
Yverdon-Sport FC players
K.A.S. Eupen players
R. Charleroi S.C. players
K.A.A. Gent players
FC Metz players
R.F.C. Seraing (1922) players
Swiss Challenge League players
Swiss Super League players
Challenger Pro League players
Belgian Pro League players
Ligue 1 players
Expatriate footballers in Belgium
Expatriate footballers in France
Swiss expatriate sportspeople in Belgium
Swiss expatriate sportspeople in France
Bosnia and Herzegovina expatriate sportspeople in Switzerland
Bosnia and Herzegovina expatriate sportspeople in Belgium
Bosnia and Herzegovina expatriate sportspeople in France
Bosnia and Herzegovina football managers
Bosnia and Herzegovina expatriate football managers
Expatriate football managers in Belgium